Holy Trinity was an Anglican parish church built in Hulme, Manchester in 1841 to a design by George Gilbert Scott and S. Moffat. Construction cost around £18,000 and was funded by Eleanora Atherton, the granddaughter of Edward Byrom, who had himself founded St John's Church, Manchester. The church was on Stretford Road, to the east of Hulme town hall.

The hammer-beam roof was decorated with plaster angels painted to resemble wood. The church was considered a good composition by The Builder. Scott used the same design for six other churches. Partially damaged by bombing in World War II, it was demolished in 1953.

See also
List of churches in Greater Manchester

References

Bibliography

Churches in Manchester
1841 establishments in England
Church of England church buildings in Greater Manchester
Anglican Diocese of Manchester
19th-century Church of England church buildings
George Gilbert Scott buildings
Buildings and structures demolished in 1953
Demolished buildings and structures in Manchester